Lajos Mecser (born 23 September 1942) is a retired Hungarian long-distance runner who won two European championships medals in 1966–67. He competed in the 5000 m at the 1964 Olympics and in the 10,000 m and marathon at the 1968 Olympics with the best result of 23rd place in the 10,000 m.

References

1942 births
Living people
Hungarian male long-distance runners
Olympic athletes of Hungary
Athletes (track and field) at the 1964 Summer Olympics
Athletes (track and field) at the 1968 Summer Olympics
European Athletics Championships medalists
Sportspeople from Borsod-Abaúj-Zemplén County
20th-century Hungarian people